

Medalists

Heats

Semifinals

Final

400 metres at the World Athletics Indoor Championships
400 metres Men